Inútil Bay (Spanish: Bahía Inútil) or Useless Bay is a bay in the western and Chilean part of Tierra del Fuego Island. Located as a body of water in the Strait of Magellan, Inútil Bay provides access to Camerón and other settlements in Timaukel commune. Timaukel commune used to be called Bahía Inútil.

The Spanish word inútil can be translated as useless. The bay was thus named in 1827 by Captain Phillip Parker King, because it afforded "neither anchorage nor shelter, nor any other advantage for the navigator".

References 

Strait of Magellan
Bays of Chile
Isla Grande de Tierra del Fuego
Bodies of water of Magallanes Region